Valence politics, also known as competence voting, is a model of voting behaviour that emphasises that individuals vote based upon "people's judgements of the overall competence of the rival political parties".

References
Political science terminology
Voting theory